is the thirteenth single by Japanese girl group Melon Kinenbi. It was released on October 27, 2004, and its highest position on the Oricon weekly chart was #25.

Track listing

External links
Champagne no Koi at the Up-Front Works release list (Japanese)

2004 singles
Zetima Records singles
Song recordings produced by Tsunku
2004 songs
Songs written by Tsunku